Nampalys Mendy (born 23 June 1992) is a professional footballer who plays as a defensive midfielder for Premier League club Leicester City. Born and raised in France, he represents Senegal at international level.

Due to his small stature, simple distribution, and reliable style of play, Mendy has been compared to former French international, Claude Makélélé. Monaco club scout Didier Christophe, for example, referred to Mendy as a "carbon copy" of Makélélé. Mendy featured in Senegal's 2021 Africa Cup of Nations Final victory against Egypt.

Club career

Early career
After leaving Sporting Toulon in June 2007, Mendy went on trial with the football section of RC Toulon. According to Monaco scout Didier Christophe, the Toulon coaches stated that Mendy was there to "make up the numbers". However, while observing Mendy in training, Christophe noticed the player's intelligence and understanding of the game and recommended him to Dominique Bijotat, who was serving as head of the Monaco youth academy.

Monaco
On 27 April 2010, Mendy signed his first professional contract, agreeing to a three-year deal with Monaco until June 2013. In July 2010, he was called up to the first team by manager Guy Lacombe for pre-season training, again to make up the numbers with Lacombe missing several players such as Diego Pérez, Nicolas Nkoulou, Park Chu-young, and Lukman Haruna, who had all participated in the 2010 FIFA World Cup.

On 7 August 2010, Mendy made his professional debut in the club's opening league match against Lyon. He played the entire 90 minutes, receiving a yellow card in the second half. Mendy picked up his first ever red card on 19 August 2011 against Amiens SC, sent off at the 70th minute mark in a 1–1 draw.

During the 2012–13 season, Mendy played a key role in Monaco's promotion back to Ligue 1. Despite the successful season, Mendy decided to leave Monaco at the end of the season after his contract expired.

Nice
Mendy was linked to teams such as Manchester United and Arsenal. Despite calling Manchester United his "dream club", Mendy rejected the move to the English side because he wanted to stay in France. After some positive talks with Nice's manager, Claude Puel, Mendy decided to join OGC Nice on a free transfer.

Mendy made his debut on 17 August 2013, in a 2–1 win against Stade Rennais. After club captain Didier Digard left for Real Betis on a free transfer at the end of 2014–15 season, and new captain Mathieu Bodmer was injured, Mendy was named captain.

Mendy made 110 appearances in three seasons for Nice and helped them to a fourth-place finish in Ligue 1 in 2015–16. He had the second highest number of passes behind Thiago Motta (2950), the most passes per game (78), and a passing accuracy of (92%), best of any player not a member of Paris Saint-Germain.

Leicester City

On 3 July 2016, Mendy moved to English Premier League champions Leicester City, managed by his former boss at Monaco, Claudio Ranieri, signing a four-year deal for £13 million, a club record at the time. The transfer record was broken again when Ahmed Musa joined Leicester for £16 million five days later, and yet again less than two months later when Islam Slimani joined Leicester for £29 million.

Mendy played his first competitive game for Leicester in a 2–1 defeat to Manchester United in the 2016 FA Community Shield on 7 August, coming on as a 63rd-minute substitute for Andy King. He suffered an ankle injury on his league debut at home against Arsenal on 20 August 2016 and was substituted in the 53rd minute. Mendy was sidelined for more than three months, and did not make his return until 7 December 2016 in a Champions League group stage match away to Porto, playing the entire game in a 5–0 defeat. He ultimately made only four league appearances for the season.

On 31 July 2017, Mendy rejoined Nice on loan.

On 24 August 2020, Mendy signed a two-year contract extension with the club.

On 10 September 2021, Mendy was left out of Leicester's final 25-man Premier League squad for the 2021–22 season. However he was then included again when the squad was updated after the January 2022 transfer window.

Mendy scored his first goal for Leicester against Tottenham on 11 February 2023.

International career
Mendy was born in France, and is of Senegalese descent. Mendy is a former French youth international having earned caps at the under-17, under-18, and under-19 levels. With the under-17 team, he went unnoticed by coach Philippe Bergeroo until the 2009 UEFA European Under-17 Championship when he was finally called up to the team. Mendy appeared in all three group stage matches as France were eliminated without winning a match. With the under-18 team, he made his debut on 29 October 2009 in a friendly match against the Denmark.

Mendy was initially called up to the under-19 team in August 2010 only to play in the Sendai Cup in Japan, but due to his consistent performances domestically, Monaco coach Guy Lacombe convinced Bergeroo to make him a permanent part of the squad. He was officially called up to the under-19 team for qualification matches for the 2011 UEFA European Under-19 Championship. Mendy made his debut with the team in a 3–0 victory over San Marino and appeared as a starter in the next two qualification matches against Montenegro and Austria, as France won both matches to finish the round undefeated.

On 9 November 2010, while still eligible to represent the under-19 and under-20 teams, Mendy was called up to the under-21 team for a friendly match against Russia.

In March 2021, Mendy received a first call-up to the Senegal national team, making his debut in a goalless draw with Congo.

Personal life
Mendy is the cousin of fellow footballers Bafétimbi Gomis and Alexandre Mendy.

Style of play
Mendy is a defensive midfielder known for his resilience, intelligence, and good distribution of the ball. Despite his age and size, Mendy has been praised for his mature and robust play, inviting comparison with former France international Claude Makélélé.

Career statistics

Club

International

Honours
Monaco
Ligue 2: 2012–13

Leicester City
FA Cup: 2020–21

Senegal
Africa Cup of Nations: 2021

Individual
Africa Cup of Nations Team of the Tournament: 2021

References

External links

Profile at the Leicester City F.C. website
 
 

1992 births
Living people
People from La Seyne-sur-Mer
Sportspeople from Var (department)
French footballers
France youth international footballers
France under-21 international footballers
Citizens of Senegal through descent
Senegalese footballers
Senegal international footballers
Association football midfielders
AS Monaco FC players
OGC Nice players
Leicester City F.C. players
Ligue 1 players
Ligue 2 players
Premier League players
2021 Africa Cup of Nations players
2022 FIFA World Cup players
Africa Cup of Nations-winning players
French expatriate footballers
Senegalese expatriate footballers
Expatriate footballers in England
French expatriate sportspeople in England
Senegalese expatriate sportspeople in England
French sportspeople of Senegalese descent
Footballers from Provence-Alpes-Côte d'Azur